Frank Grønlund (born 13 December 1952) is a Norwegian football official and former player. He played for Lillestrøm SK and was capped twice for the Norwegian national team. After his active career he was player-coach of Skeid (1984–1985) and Aurskog/Finstadbru (1987–1989). Since 1991 Grønlund has served in Lillestrøm SK as director of sports, managing director, chairman and chief executive.

References

External links
 
 

1952 births
Living people
Association football defenders
Norwegian footballers
Norway international footballers
Lillestrøm SK players
Eliteserien players
Skeid Fotball players
Norwegian football managers
Norwegian sports executives and administrators
Lillestrøm SK non-playing staff